Arezzo railway station serves the city of Arezzo in Tuscany, Italy. This station is the most important in all the province.

Overview
There is a large operational freight yard.

Arezzo is part of the Centostazioni network which includes the hundred most important stations in Italy.

Two railway companies serve Arezzo: 
Trenitalia (Ferrovie dello Stato group) operates the majority of trains. It provides services to the Valdarno, Valtiberina, Rome, Florence, Milan, Naples.
La Ferrovia Italiana (LFI) operates only trains to Pratovecchio and Sinalunga.

Arezzo station is near to the interconnections (Arezzo Nord and Arezzo Sud) with the "direttissima" high speed line. This provides connections to Florence in less than 40 minutes covering a distance of 88 kilometres.

This station is part of the "Memorario" project which provides a regular timetable.

Arezzo has 1.126 million passenger movements annually.  The following trains stop every day in Arezzo:
 126 regional trains
 19 InterCity trains
 2 Frecciarossa trains

The station has a CCTV surveillance on all platforms and in the subway.

All platforms, except for platform 6, are connected by a subway and lifts.

The first platform of the station was originally three rails, to allow the transit of narrow-gauge trains to Fossato di Vico.

Station layout
This station has seven platforms. Only platforms 1 North (service to Pratovecchio) and 6 (service to Sinalunga) are dedicated to LFI trains. 
All the other platforms are used for Trenitalia services.

Adjacent stations

!Previous!!!!Line!!!!Next

See also

History of rail transport in Italy
List of railway stations in Tuscany
Rail transport in Italy
Railway stations in Italy

Notes

External links
Trenitalia
LFI
Live arrivals/departures

Railway stations in Tuscany
Railway stations opened in 1866
Railway station
1866 establishments in Italy
Railway stations in Italy opened in the 19th century